Straight from the Heart is the fifth studio album by American country music singer Daryle Singletary. It was released on February 27, 2007 via Shanachie Records. Like his last album, 2002's That's Why I Sing This Way, this album is largely composed of cover songs, save for "I Still Sing This Way", which is an original song. It and "Jesus & Bartenders" were both released as singles from this album, although both failed to chart. As with his last covers album, this one includes several guest appearances.

Track listing

Personnel
 John Anderson - vocals on "Black Sheep"
 Joe Caverlee - fiddle
 Shannon Forrest - drums
 Aubrey Haynie - fiddle
 Mike Johnson - steel guitar
 Catherine Styron Marx - piano
 Brent Mason - electric guitar
 Duncan Mullins - bass guitar
 Danny Parks - electric guitar
 Hargus "Pig" Robbins - piano
 Daryle Singletary - lead vocals
 Ricky Skaggs - vocals on "I've Got a Tiger by the Tail"
 Bryan Sutton - acoustic guitar
 Darrin Vincent - background vocals
 Rhonda Vincent - vocals on "We"re Gonna Hold On"

Chart performance

References

2007 albums
Covers albums
Shanachie Records albums
Daryle Singletary albums